Bajatey Raho is a 2013 Indian Hindi-language comedy film directed by Shashant Shah and produced by Krishika Lulla. The film stars Tusshar Kapoor, Dolly Ahluwalia, Ranvir Shorey, Vinay Pathak and Vishakha Singh. The film follows a bunch of unlikely avengers get into the act, and cons a wealthy but fraud businessmen.

Bajatey Raho is director Shah's third film, after Dasvidaniya (2008) and Chalo Dilli (2011), both of which starred Pathak in the lead. The film released on 26 July 2013 to mixed reviews from critics.

Plot

The movie begins with Sukhmeet (Sukhi) (Tusshar Kapoor) applying for an admission for his son, Kabootar, from a school. However, Principal Sethi (Rammakant Daayama) refuses to do so as Sukhi's son both has bad grades and is playing with a PSP even during the interview. But, in order to get admission, Sukhi bribes Principal Sethi, to which he gives positive responses. But, when Suki moves his tie sideways, Principal Sethi is able to see that behind it was attaches a transmitter. It is revealed that Ballu (Ranvir Shorey) and Sukhi were conducting a sting operation on the principal, and that the PSP Kabootar was holding was in reality a camera recording the whole interview in High Definition. Sukhi threatens to hand the recording right to the media, and if Principal Sethi wanted to happen otherwise, he was to pay the amount of 3 crores to Sukhi and Ballu.

As per their instructions, Sethi keeps the suitcase with money on the decided area and goes to collect the PSP. However, he is horrified to find a movie clip in the PSP, implying that they had fooled him and that they were going to publish the disreputable recording anyway. But, when he rushes to take the suitcase, a police car pulls over, and police officer Mintu Hasan (Vinay Pathak) take the suitcase, saying that it was one of the many suitcases in the area which were bearing bombs.

Shortly after, it is revealed that Mintu was a dupe police officer, and that he is in cahoots with Sukhi and Ballu. Then, a flashback is shown, revealing that Sukhi's father Mr. Baweja (Yogendra Tikku) was an honest man working at a bank, and his wicked boss, Mohanlal Sabharwal (Ravi Kishan) had swindled 15 crores from innocent people and framed Mr. Baweja and his assistant, Saira for it. Mr. Baweja had died of cardiac arrest, meanwhile Saira, who was also Mintu's wife, was imprisoned. As such, Sukhi and his family was ordered by the court to pay the investors their money back. It is also revealed that the school they had looted was owned by Sabharwal.

According to their next strategy, Mrs. Baweja and Mintu dress as food inspectors and barge into Sabharwal's milk factory which, as they had recently found out, supplied adultered and ingenuine products. Using this excuse, along with high complexity, they arrive Sabharwal's friend's house from where they try to steal the fridge which they knew to be filled with the same 15 crores, but resort to just leaving the refrigerator and running away on the sudden and unanticipated arrival of Sabharwal.

As per their last plan, Sukhi's girlfriend Manpreet (Vishakha Singh), posing as dance trainer, goes to Sabbarwahl's house to spy on him. They soon come to know that Sabbarwahl, busy preparing for his daughter's wedding, has promised to pay 15 crore to her in-laws, the Kapoors. Meanwhile, Mummyji and Mintoo, disguised as Hansal builders, instigate the Kapoors against Sabbarwahl. Finally on the wedding night, Sukhi and Ballu dressed as caterers sneak into Sabbarwahl's farmhouse and hide all the money in gift packs. Sabbarwahl unknowingly distributes all the money hidden in gift boxes to guests who were actually the investors. On knowing the truth about Sukhi and the group, Sabbarwahl attacks them with a gun, only to be confronted by his own daughter. Sabbarwahl confesses to his crime and is later jailed for seven years, which completes the revenge of the Baweja family.

Cast
 Tusshar Kapoor as Sukhwinder Baweja (Sukhi)
 Dolly Ahluwalia as Jasbeer Baweja (Mummyji/Mrs. Hansal Mehta)
 Ranvir Shorey as Ballu
 Vinay Pathak as Mintoo Hasan
 Vishakha Singh as Manpreet
 Ravi Kishan as Mohanlal Sabharwal
 Kamlesh Gill as Naniji
 Rammakant Daayama as Principal Sethi
 Husaan Saad as Kabootar
 Rajinder Nanu as Raman
 Vikas Mohla as Pawan
 Nikhil Pandey as Aman Kapoor
 Neyha Sharma as Aman's Friend
 Svetlana Manolyo as Jeni
 Brijendra Kala as Bagga
 Yogendra Tikku as Baweja Ji
 Sunil Chitkara as Inspector
 Maryam Zakaria as item number "Nagin Dance"
 Scarlett Mellish Wilson as item number "Nagin Dance"

Soundtrack

Filming
The film was shot in Delhi in February and March 2013, including a schedule in the Chhattarpur area of the city and pathways world school of aravali

References

External links
 
 

2010s Hindi-language films
2010s comedy thriller films
2013 films
Indian comedy thriller films
Films scored by Jaidev Kumar
Films shot in Delhi
Sony Pictures Networks India films
2013 comedy films
Sony Pictures films
Columbia Pictures films